Air Togo (Compagnie Aerienne Togolaise)  was an airline headquartered in Lomé in Togo. Operational between 1998 and 2000, it served as the country's flag carrier, operating flights between Togo and France, as well as to neighbouring countries in West Africa, out of its base at Lomé-Tokoin Airport.

Services 
Air Togo international destinations from Lomé have included Accra, Bamako, Cotonou, Ouagadougou and Paris.

Domestic services have included Sokodé, Mango, Dapaong, Kara, Niamtougoui and Lomé.

References

External links
Air Togo fleet detail

Defunct airlines of Togo
Airlines established in 1998
Airlines disestablished in 2000
Lomé